Uatumã Biological Reserve is a Biological reserve around the river Uatumã in the state of Amazonas in Brazil.

Location

The Uatumã Biological Reserve is divided between the municipalities of Urucará (35.55%), São Sebastião do Uatumã (16.56%) and Presidente Figueiredo (47.89%) in Amazonas.
It lies along the northeast shore of the Balbina Dam reservoir.
To the west is adjoins the Waimiri Atroari Indigenous Territory.
The Pitinga mine is northwest of the reserve.
The Trombetas/Mapuera Indigenous Territory is north and east of the reserve.

History

The reserve was originally established in 1990 in the municipalities of São Sebastião do Uatumã and Itapiranga.
It covered .
It became part of the Central Amazon Ecological Corridor, established in 2002.
The reserve was expanded by decree on 19 September 2002.
The advisory council was created on 23 July 2008.
It is administered by the Chico Mendes Institute for Biodiversity Conservation.

Conservation

The Biological Reserve is a "strict nature reserve" under IUCN protected area category Ia.
The purpose is to preserve the biological diversity of the dense rainforest ecosystem in the basin of the Uatumã River and Jatapu River, and the lake and island ecosystems formed by the Balbina Dam on the Uatumã, and to protect endemic, rare, vulnerable or endangered species.
The conservation unit is supported by the Amazon Region Protected Areas Program.
Protected species in the reserve include the sponge anheteromeyenia ornata and the amazonian manatee (trichechus inunguis).

References

Sources

2002 establishments in Brazil
Biological reserves of Brazil
Protected areas of Amazonas (Brazilian state)
Protected areas established in 2002